Gregory Gale is a New York-based costume designer.

Career
Gale is a graduate of the Fashion Institute of Technology and is well known for his character-driven designs.  In 2009 he was nominated for a Tony Award for Best Costume Design of a Musical for Rock of Ages, a musical that uses the classic rock hits from the 1980s. He was also nominated for a Tony Award for Best Costume Design of a Play in 2008 for his work on Cyrano de Bergerac. In 2007 Gale won the Lucille Lortel Award for Outstanding Costume Design for his work on The Voysey Inheritance.  He was also nominated that same year for his work on The Milliner.

Works
Gale has designed costumes for Broadway, International Productions, Off-Broadway, Regional Theaters, National Tours, Opera, Las Vegas and Special Events.  Some of the most notable are:

Broadway
Arcadia - (2011) 
Cyrano De Bergerac - (2007–2008) Tony Award and Henry Hewes Design Award nominations Best Costume Design of a Play
Rock of Ages - (2009 to present day)Tony Award and Henry Hewes Design Award nominations Best Costume Design of a Musical. Other productions include: West End, Toronto and Australia
The Wedding Singer -  (2006) Drama Desk Nomination
Urinetown - (2001–2004) Lucille Lortel Award nomination
Band In Berlin - (1999)

Off-Broadway
Bunnicula - (2013)
Now. Here. This. - (2012)
Rock of Ages - (2008–2009)
The Third Story - (2008) Henry Hewes Design Award Nomination
The Voysey Inheritance - (2006–2007) Lucille Lortel Award Winner and Henry Hewes Design Award nomination Best Costume Design of a Play
The Milliner - (2006)
Pig Farm, a play by Greg Kotis - (2006)
Burleigh Grimes - (2006)
Rope - (2005)
The Downtown Plays - (2004)
The Thing About Men - (2003)
Bright Ideas - (2003)
Mondo Drama - (2003)
The Dazzle - (2002)
Free to Be You and Me - (2002)
The Dark Kalamazoo - (2002)
Rude Entertainment - (2001)
Urinetown - (2001) Lucille Lortel Award nomination
The Torch-Bearers - (2000)
The Country Club - (1999) Drama Desk Awards nomination
Hope is the Thing With Feathers - (1998)
As Thousands Cheer - (1998)
Uncle Tom's Cabin - (1997)
Night of the Tribades - (1993)
The Stronger - (1993)
Mary Stuart - (1992)
The Infernal Machine - (1990)
The Prince of Homburg - (1990)

Regional
How to Succeed in Business Without Really Trying - (Goodspeed Opera House)
Bombshells - (Milwaukee Repertory Theater)
The Man Who Came to Dinner - (Alley Theater Houston)
Rich and Famous - (A.C.T. San Francisco)
The Third Story - (La Jolla Playhouse)
A Flea in Her Ear - (Williamstown Theater Festival)
The Great Game - (Broadway Previews at Duke)
High Button Shoes - (Goodspeed Opera House)
Seven Brides for Seven Brothers - (Goodspeed Opera House)
The Pajama Game - (Goodspeed Opera House)
Crush the Infamous Thing - (Coconut Grove Playhouse)
Lives of the Saints, a play anthology by David Ives - (Berkshire Theater Festival)
Merton of the Movies - (Geffen Playhouse)
Oklahoma! - (Ordway Theater)
Zorro - (TUTS Houston)
Rhinoceros - (New Jersey Shakespeare)

National Tours
Bunnicula
Rock of Ages
Urinetown
Oh, Figaro - (National Theater of the Deaf)
The Comedy of Errors - (The Acting Company)

Opera
The Magic Flute - (Chicago Opera Theater)
Bitter Sweet - (Bard Summerscape)

Las Vegas
Rock of Ages - (Venetian Hotel)
Surf, the Musical - (Planet Hollywood)

Special Events
FIFA Conference Opening Ceremony Federation Internationale de Football Association  - (2009)
The New York Chocolate Show - Chocolate Fashion Show - (2007, 2009)
Opening Ceremony Mass Celebration of the Pope's Visit to Yankee Stadium  - (2007)
Sex and the City Film DVD Release Party at the New York Public Library  - (2007)

Notes

External links
Gregory Gale Costume Design

Internet Off-Broadway Database listing
NY Times Slideshow - Rock of Ages
Broadway.com Behind the Scenes Interview: Rock of Ages Nails 80s Fashion
Tony Award Performance Rock of Ages
NY Times Slideshow - Cyrano de Bergerac
PBS Great Performances Excerpt #1 - Cyrano de Bergerac
PBS Great Performances Excerpt #2 - Cyrano de Bergerac
PBS Great Performances Excerpt #3 - Cyrano de Bergerac
NY Times Excerpt - Arcadia
From Sketch to Stage, New York Times Interview for The Wedding Singer
Tony Award Performance - The Wedding Singer
NY Daily News Interview "80s Wedding Tied to Style Era
Tony Award Performance Urinetown
NY Times Slideshow - The Third Story
NY Times Slideshow Interview with Michael Stuhlbarg
All Gussied Up Goodspeed's "High Button Shoes" is a Costumer's Dream
Food Network Will Work for Food Chocolate Fashion Show

American costume designers
Living people
Fashion Institute of Technology alumni
Year of birth missing (living people)